Edward Savage (1560 – c. 1622) was an English politician.

He was a member (MP) of the Parliament of England for Newton in 1584 and 1586 and for Stockbridge in 1601.

References

1560 births
1620s deaths
English MPs 1584–1585
English MPs 1586–1587
English MPs 1601